The Jules Verne Viaduct is a viaduct constructed in 1987 that crosses the River Somme near Camon, east of Amiens. It is located at 49° 53' 2.28" N, 2° 22' 18.42" E. It was designed by Charles Lavigne.

References

Viaducts in France
Bridges completed in 1987